was a Japanese artist and author who from 1897 - 1942 was based in London.

Biography
He was born in the town of Koromo, Toyota, Aichi, Japan, at birth being named Makino Heijirō. He was the youngest of 3 children, Yoshi (the oldest daughter) and Toshitarō (the oldest son). His mother was Makino Katsu, his father being Makino Toshimoto, who founded and taught at their Koromo Primary School. His grandfather was an artist named Bai Yen. The Makino family was an old samurai family (see Chōnin), although due to changes in the structures of Japanese society, the samurai class had been abolished by 1873.

In July 1875, he began his education at the Koromo School in Japan, graduating in October 1883. From August 1884 he taught at the Otani School in Chita-gun, eventually resigning in the autumn. At his resignation, he was adopted into the Isogai family (distant relatives), changing his name to Makino Yoshio. He then began working in Hagiwara Primary School until he moved to live with his biological father in Toyoaki City. In 1886 he became an assistant teacher at Haruki Primary School working and living with his brother Toshitarō. Here he began to study English and the Chinese classics in Nagoya. In November 1887 he began at the Nagoya Eiwa School under a scholarship from American Protestant missionaries. In 1889 he applied to join the military, but was rejected for failing a physical examination to join. So in 1890, he borrowed money from his sister (then Fujishima Kyo), to stay in Yokohama with his cousin Hotta Maki, graduating that summer from Nagoya Eiwa.

In March 1901, the Naval Inspector's Office closed due to finishing the order of warships being sent to Japan, and although offered the return fare to Japan, Markino decided to stay in London where he spent most of his subsequent life and career. He would spend the fare instead on art supplies and rent. From late 1910 he traveled with the suffragette Christabel Pankhurst lecturing on women's voting rights in the United Kingdom.

Makino anglicised his name to Markino to prevent it being mispronounced as Maykino.

In 1922 he married a young French woman named Marie who had come to Markino asking for help from her domestic situation at home. They married and moved to New York and Boston the marriage ending in 1927 on the grounds that it was never consummated and Marie had instead married another man in America. Markino described the relationship being 'like sister and brother'.

Artist

Japan
In 1880 he began to study Bunjinga with his brother under Tamegai Chikko until October 1883. In 1886 he began to learn Yōga sketching techniques under Nozaki Kanekiyo and Mizuno Manji. In October 1887, he began working as a designer for the Nagoya Design Company in Nagoya.

In 1952 he attended a party at the British Embassy in Tokyo where he would gift the British diplomats with a copy of his Thames Embankment in Winter woodblock print.

United States
He was curious about and attracted to Western culture and left Japan from Yokohama on The Peru. In 1893 aged 24, Markino obtained a travel permit to the United States to study from June, arriving in July 1893 in San Francisco. Through a letter of introduction to the Japanese Consul of San Francisco, he gained assistance from Suzuki Utsujirō who encouraged Markino to pursue his artistic career. So in November 1893 Markino started his tuition at the Mark Hopkins Institute of Art. In 1894 he received news that his father had died. In April 1895 Yone Noguchi visited Markino. During this time he mastered his 'silk veil' technique allowing him to depict his signature fog and mist watercolour style 'to paint the thick fog that rolled in from the sea at certain times of the year'. In June 1897 upon being introduced by correspondence to Hayashi Tadamasa, a Paris-based Japanese art dealer, by Sakurai Shozo, he travelled to New York, where in August he met Miyake Katsumi (a yoga style painter) at the Japan Assembly Hall. 

He had gone through numerous jobs and was racially discriminated against between 1893 - 1897. As well as being spat on in public for his race in California(where anti-Japanese sentiment was high due to the growing population of Issei) speaking to the reporter Frank Harris on religious intolerance, he noted 'the Christian hypocrisy," Markino continued, "is far worse in America than in England. When I used to say in San Francisco that I was not a Christian they used to turn from me as if I had said I was decaying. It is an ignorant, thoughtless people.'
There he also had limited opportunity based on his societal status and had difficulty finding decent employers, working as a house-boy for a dollar and a half a day. He was degraded further when his first employer refused to learn his Japanese name on the basis it was too difficult to remember and instead referred to him as 'Charlie'.

Between 18 October 1923 and 9 March 1927 he moved to North America. His work "The Plaza Hotel, New York City" (1924) was completed on this trip for instance as well as writing essays. He had trouble selling his work again however so he returned to London.

France
In November 1897 Markino travelled from New York to Paris to meet Hayashi, but Hayashi had by that time returned to Japan. He returned in August 1907 when his publishers asked him to go to Paris to produce his work The Colour of Paris, staying until June 1908. During this period he met Auguste Rodin in the home of Leon Benedite. He returned again from Rome to Paris, staying from May 1909 - June 1909.

United Kingdom

In December 1897, Markino decided to move to London on the advice of Ide Umataro who he had met during his time studying art. From 1898 he began working in the Japanese Naval Inspector's Office in London by day and studying in South Kensington College of Science at nightschool. In March 1898 he began studying with the Goldsmith Technical College, switching in 1900 over to the Central School of Art and Design where he would work as an artist's model and later designing tomb-stone markers for 3 months only, on account that he had offended conservative religious mourners by his depiction of angels as 'ballet dancers'. Incredibly poor, he would often visit publishers for day-to-day work and walked everywhere as he had no money for the public transport living on 'Bovril and rice'. He kept a studio in No. 39 Redcliffe Road, South Kensington living in Brixton.

Given his financial straits, Markino became downtrodden, eventually being encouraged by Henry Wilson. Wilson, fond of 
 Japanese art, promised to introduce him to Charles Holmes (who was also known to be fond of the vogue for Japanese woodcuts) who was the editor of The Studio. In November 1901, his works were published in Studio, introducing Markino as an artist. In December, he met Hirobumi Ito. October 1902 his work began to become popular, publishing The Japanese Dumpy Book with Grants Richard and in King Magazine. From November 1902 he began living with Noguchi in Brixton, Markino at this stage in his career frequently having little income. In 1903 his work appeared in The English Illustrated Magazine and he illustrated Noguchi's From the Eastern Sea and for Unicorn Press as an illustrator. His work in August was published in the Magazine of Art. Marion Spielmann the editor fond of Markino's sketches, took him under his wing and introduced him to a wider Edwardian social circle, encouraging Markino to draw, paint and write, introducing him to Douglas Sladen. Sladen onwards would invite him to his Kensington home for tea and art parties.

In 1904 the artist Hara Bushō moved in with Markino until May 1905. In September 1905, Markino was nominated for the Venice Great Art Exposition representing Britain Art Association, and based on the recommendation of the editor of the Magazine of Art, (M. Spielmann), he receives membership as a research student for national museums in Britain. In 1906 his illustrations of London, were published 8 May 1907 in The Colour of London achieving critical acclaim, holding an exhibition of his works in Clifford Gallery in Haymarket. From May until June though, he became hospitalized in West London due to complications from a gastrointestinal related operation complication.

In 1908 The Colour of Paris and  The Colour of Rome were published in England by Chatto and Windus, and after having traveled to Paris and Rome, he returned to London in September 1909 to work on his next work Oxford from Within staying in Oxford to research the new work. In 1910 with the publication of A Japanese artist in London and Oxford from Within, he guided friends around the Japan–British Exhibition, and he appeared in that year's Who's Who, until 1949. In 1911 he released a watercolour of Windsor Castle to celebrate Queen Mary's coronation. In 1912 The Charm of London was further published.

From 1918 onwards he studied Greek, Latin and English historical literature, continuing to write, paint and lecture, but his popularity waned with the death of influential friends in WWI. He married and moved country from 1923 - 1927, but upon his return found all his belongings he had left with another Japanese resident of London had been swindled. He managed to set up another exhibition and sell his watercolours but due to his time away from the literary scene was regarded as outdated and lived a truly bohemian lifestyle with English and Japanese friends from there on out.

A devoted Anglophile, Markino only returned to Japan in 1942 due to WWII when England declared war on Japan for attacking British Malaya, Singapore and Hong Kong. In 1952 in Kamakura he met Carmen Blacker who was studying ascetic Buddhism there on the way up a set of temple steps, in 'a shirt covered in smears of blue and green paint ... a sketchbook in his hand' rambling for almost 4 hours in English and Japanese rushing up the steps out of breath aged 83 noting 'how happy he had been in London, and that he had never wanted to leave [as] he had so many friends, and was never tired of sketching the people and painting the mists.'

Italy
Markino lived in Rome from October 1908 to May 1909 to illustrate The Colour of Rome. From 1910 July to October he stays with his friends the Sladens and Olave Potter researching for his illustrations of A Little Pilgrimage in Italy. Olave and Markino were said to be romantically involved.

Writing
Among his friends and acquaintances were the writers Yone Noguchi who introduced him to Arthur Ransome, M. P. Shiel, and the artist Pamela Colman Smith. Although unnamed, he plays an important role in Ransome's Bohemia in London, and is considered to have been the model for the male protagonist in Shiel's book The Yellow Wave (1905) — a Romeo and Juliet-type tragic romance on the background of the Russo-Japanese War of 1904–1905.

He was invited by the English Review to write a series of essays and to author a signed weekly column with the Evening News in 1910 and another column in the Daily News in 1911. Markino's literary talents were also recognized, and with the support of friends like Douglas Sladen he published several autobiographical works, including A Japanese Artist in London (1910), When I was a Child (1912), and My Recollections and Reflections (1913).  Markino's style was appreciated by British readers who enjoyed his unique humour.

His writings were also supportive of the suffragette movement and he had many female friends, his 'Idealised John Bullesses' and biographies frequently note his interactions and support with women's marches and suffragettes like Christabel Pankhurst. Sarah Grand noted he was 'a thorough gentleman' when reading his writing in 1912. Another friend, Flora Roscoe; an Englishwoman who lived in the hamlet of Wedhampton; knowing how Markino had a hatred of business (something which he believed the English took too seriously) invited him in 1912 to stay to sketch the area, later travelling to Salisbury. Another time in a Markino fashion he met Adeline Genée; 
 I had an appointment with Adeline Genée to meet her by the stage entrance of the Empire some years ago; my friend was with me when I went there.  I was going to interview her by some paper's request.  I was sitting by the stage entrance when I soon found a lady no longer young nor beautiful; she was, however, a most delightful person to talk with.  How anxious I was to get rid of her as I had an important work of seeing Adeline Genée.  Strangely enough she was quite composed, with no visible intention of leaving me alone; my friend who saw me slightly tired and disinterested, asked me loudly if I wished to leave the place.  I jumped up and explained; "Why, I must see Madame Genée!"  My friend began to laugh almost wildly and exclaimed again: "Markino, you have been talking there with Madame Genée more than half an hour.

Stagework

During 1900 he witnessed the kabuki performances of Otojirō Kawakami in London. In December 1903 Markino advised on costume design and set design on Kamigami no Choji performed at Her Majesty's Theatre, and designed the theatre program.

In 1915 he co-produced a season of Russian, French and Italian Opera at the London Opera House.  Directed by Vladimir Rosing, the season included the first performance by Japanese singer, Tamaki Miura as Cio-Cio-San in Madama Butterfly.

Art style
He was a popular member of a significant group of expatriate Japanese artists working in London, including Urushibara Mokuchu, Ishibashi Kazunori, Hara Busho and Matsuyama Ryuson. He was and has been best known for his childlike whimsy and mannerisms which Hara Basho noted: 
 There are thousands of artists who can use their brushes better than you.  Then why do all your English friends admire your work so much?  Because of your own personality You are very faithful to everybody and everything.  This nature of yours appears quite unconsciously in every picture of yours.  Indeed, some of your pictures are full of faults—but very innocent and delightful faults, which make me smile. ... [to which Markino] exclaims: "But don't you see how poor is my art: Who am I after all?  Proper name for me is an art lover."

On his Whitechapel exhibit in 1910 the critic and Japanese art specialist Laurence Binyon criticized 'the ever popular colours, "best known and most prized in Europe, while ... the least valued in Japan' present in the watercolours based on dispelling the notion of the time which Oscar Wilde called in his 'The Decay of Lying' essay 'pure invention', Binyon was dissuaded by the toned down colour pallette which pandered to Europeans, instead wishing that 'a loan exhibition may be formed which shall at least adumbrate the range and history of [Japanese] art'.

Mist

Dissatisfied with the fogs of San Francisco, Heiji of the fog moved to London to 'produce "a study of London mists". Markino noted 'When I came to London first, I thought the buildings, figures, and everything in the distance, looked comparatively large, because in Japan the atmosphere is so clear that you can see every small detail in the distance, while here your background is mystified abruptly, which has great charm to me.' His favourite mist was the 'gentle mist [where] London becomes a city of romance' or with its 'autumn mist's'. 'London looks ten times nicer if you see her through the mist.''

Markino would use oil paints by blending the primary colour to achieve 'the silk veil technique. "I can achieve a very soft colour by mixing in oils the strongest primary colour with its opponent colour . . . I made many other discoveries and was able to achieve some sense of light while trying to draw a silken veil".

Fog

Markino himself often enjoyed the wet and fog of London street scenes (both being popular Japanese motifs) and the paintings of J M W Turner.  He would eventually fall for the charms of 'thick fogs'. 'A gaslight shining on a wet pavement in a fog is a miracle of beauty; it is like a pool of molten gold', with how 'wet pavements reflect everything as if the whole city was built on a lake'. The silk technique Markino learned in California was used to present the ebbing and rising of the heavy fogs of London from the factories of the industrial revolution of multifarious tones and colour, which London residents described as pea-soupers when the air would turn yellow and green and 'stick' to shiny surfaces like window panes.

Hybridisation
There was a blending of Japanese and Western techniques in Markino's approach. He would use the plein air technique or memory (a more commonly Japanese tradition) to sketch noting 'I always work work out entirely from the impression I get on the street so that sometimes it looks quite in the Japanese style, and other times quite European ... every day I come back from street study I always draw out all the figures I have seen during the day (from notebook or from memory) ... to make a finished picture I compose all those figures.'

Traditionally in Japanese art seasons play a large role. In London, winter then was Markino's favourite season in London, he often enjoyed the way snow affected the everyday landscape of London. 'that house in front of my window is painted in black and yellow. When I came here last summer I laughed at its ugly colour. But now the winter fog covers it, and the harmony of its colour is most wonderful'. 'Then no matter what ugly colours you may make your houses, if they pass through only one winter, the London fogs would so nicely greyly them always!'.

Several of his works are held in the collections of the Museum of London. H G Wells on buying Markinos work noted 'I want to carry London to my Paris flat and this picture is the concentrated essence of London.'

Illustrated Works

Works

There was a little man and he had a little gun (1902)
Japanese Dumpty (1903)
From the Eastern Sea (1903)
The Colour of London (1907)
The Colour of Paris (1908)
The Colour of Rome (1909)
A Japanese Artist in London (1910)
Oxford from Within (1910)
A Little Pilgrimage in Italy (1911)
Idealised John Bullesses (1912)
The Charm of London (1912)
When I was a child (1912);
Recollections and Reflections of a Japanese Artist (1913)
Twenty years of my Life (1913)
The Story of Yone Noguchi (1914)
Confucian Discipline (1936)

References

External links
"Plaza Hotel, New York City"

1869 births
1956 deaths
Artists from Aichi Prefecture
British artists
Japanese writers
Japanese expatriates in the United Kingdom
20th-century Japanese painters
Writers from Aichi Prefecture